The following lists events that happened during 2010 in the United Arab Emirates.

Incumbents
President: Khalifa bin Zayed Al Nahyan 
Prime Minister: Mohammed bin Rashid Al Maktoum

Events

January
 January 2 - The 2010 Capitala World Tennis Championship ends after starting on December 31, 2009.
 January 4 - Burj Khalifa, the world tallest building, was opened to the public.
 January 10 - Sheikh Issa bin Zayed Al Nahyan is acquitted of beating a former business partner in a videotaped attack.
 January 19 - Assassination of Mahmoud al-Mabhouh in Dubai.

February
 February 4 - Debt-ridden emirate of Dubai confirms the discovery of a new oilfield.
 February 19 - Dubai's police chief calls for the head of Mossad to be arrested if Israel's spy agency is found to have been behind the killing of a Hamas boss in the emirate.

March
 March 1 - In response to the assassination of Mahmoud al-Mabhouh, Dubai's police chief states that travelers suspected of being Israeli will not be allowed into the United Arab Emirates even if they arrive with passports issued by other countries.
 March 10–13 - Emirates Airline Festival of Literature occurs in Dubai.
 March 26 - Ahmed bin Zayed Al Nahyan, chief of the Abu Dhabi Investment Authority and one of the most powerful men in the world, goes missing after his glider crashes into a lake in Morocco.
 March 30 - Ahmed bin Zayed Al Nahyan's body is recovered four days after his crash.

April
 April 27 - Kenya's foreign minister Moses Wetangula arrives in the United Arab Emirates to resolve a diplomatic row after Kenya interrogated and deported members of the UAE's ruling family on terrorism charges.

August
 August 1 - The United Arab Emirates will suspend some BlackBerry mobile services from October amid concerns that data from some equipment is being exported offshore and managed by foreign organisations.

September
 September 3 - UPS Airlines Flight 6 crashes in Dubai near the International Airport, killing both crew members.

December
 December 9–19 - 2010 FIFA Club World Cup is hosted by United Arab Emirates.
 December 15–19 - The 10th World Swimming Championships takes place in Dubai.

Deaths
 24 February – Mubarak bin Mohammed Al Nahyan, the first interior minister and member of the royal family (born 1935)

References

External links

 
United Arab Emirates
United Arab Emirates
2010s in the United Arab Emirates
Years of the 21st century in the United Arab Emirates